Rogovskaya is a rural locality (a village) in Paustovskoye Rural Settlement, Vyaznikovsky District, Vladimir Oblast, Russia. The population was 82 as of 2010.

Geography 
Rogovskaya is located 26 km south of Vyazniki (the district's administrative centre) by road. Oktyabrskaya is the nearest rural locality.

References 

Rural localities in Vyaznikovsky District